Florin Vlăduț Popa (born 27 March 1996) is a Romanian rugby union player. He plays as a Centre for professional SuperLiga club Timișoara Saracens. Ioniță also plays for Romania's national team the Oaks.

References

External links

 Florin Vlăduț Popa at Timișoara Saracens website

1996 births
Living people
Romanian rugby union players
Romania international rugby union players
SCM Rugby Timișoara players
Rugby union centres